The United Opposition was a coalition of anti-Venizelist Greek political parties for the elections of 1920.

Its main leader was Dimitrios Gounaris. Members to the coalition were:
 People's Party
 Party of Nationalists
 Conservative Party
 Reform Party
 and other small right-wing and anti-Venizelist parties

1920 establishments in Greece
1922 disestablishments in Greece
Defunct political party alliances in Greece
Monarchist parties in Greece